Irena Creed is a Canadian hydrologist. She is currently the vice-principal for research and innovation at University of Toronto Scarborough. She was the associate vice-president for research at the University of Saskatchewan, and the executive director of and a professor at the School of Environment and Sustainability. Creed continues to study the impacts of global climate change on ecosystem functions and services, specifically focusing on the hydrology of freshwater catchments.

Education 

Creed did her undergraduate and graduate studies at the University of Toronto. Creed graduated with honors with a Bachelor of Science in zoology with a minor in botany. She then went on to pursue a Master of Science in botany and environmental sciences, and finally, a PhD in geography. Creed then became a postdoctoral fellow at the University of Alberta, where she studied forest management strategies and their impacts on surrounding ecosystems.

Career and research 
From 1998 to 2017, Creed was a professor at Western University in the Biology and Geography departments. Creed was the executive director of the School of Environment and Sustainability at the University of Saskatchewan. Creed also remains an adjunct professor at Western University and also holds adjunct appointments at the University of Guelph and the United Nations University Institute for Water, Environment, and Health.

Creed's research is based in planetary health, both locally and globally. Specifically, Creed focuses on hydrology and the impacts of water on surrounding ecosystems. Creed's work is focused on involving water more in discussions of forest management. Creed's work looks at the role of water in both terrestrial and aquatic ecosystems, specifically focusing on the Saskatchewan and the Great Lakes and St. Lawrence River basins. She led an unprecedented collaborative effort, the Great Lakes Futures Project, between researchers in the United States and Canada. The project was a cross-disciplined assessment of future management practices of the Great Lakes area. Creed also works on a global scale and has participated in multiple international reports on climate change including one for the United States National Academy of Sciences and another for the Global Forest Expert Panel and the International Union of Forest Research Organisations.

In 2019 Creed was elected to the Royal Society of Canada (RSC). She is the recipient of the RSC's Bancroft Award for outstanding contributions in earth sciences.

Contributions 
Creed has studied the hydrologic effects of nutrient cycling in forest ecosystems. Using unique methodology and statistics, Creed and her team discovered the variation of nutrient deposition in catchments and release into atmosphere. This information was previously unknown to scientists, specifically that summer storms cause nitrogen to release into the atmosphere, explaining why catchments are often missing expected nitrogen in summer months. Creed has shared this work both with other scientists as well as with policy makers who work on forest management.

Creed has also made a significant impact on the Great Lakes Region with her work on risk management, which combined science and policy. This work utilized International Organization of Standardization tools in order to gain a better understanding of the risks associated with natural resource extraction in the region. Creed has used ISO tools in other work as well in order to access risk in ecosystem management techniques in a changing climate.

References 

Living people
Year of birth missing (living people)
Place of birth missing (living people)
Academic staff of the University of Saskatchewan
Canadian hydrologists
Women hydrologists
Canada Research Chairs
University of Toronto alumni
Academic staff of the University of Western Ontario
Climate activists